The W. W. Hetherington House is a historic house in Atchison, Kansas. It was built in 1879 for Webster Wirt Hetherington, the second president of Atchison's Exchange
National Bank, founded by his father William.

The house was designed in the Romanesque architectural style by Alfred Meier. It has been listed on the National Register of Historic Places since July 12, 1974.

References

Houses on the National Register of Historic Places in Kansas
National Register of Historic Places in Atchison County, Kansas
Houses completed in 1879